Modern Saxophone Stylings of Charlie Mariano is a 10-inch album by alto saxophonist Charlie Mariano, recorded in 1951.

Recording and music
Modern Saxophone Stylings of Charlie Mariano was recorded in Boston in 1951. The musicians were Mariano on alto sax, trumpeter Herb Pomeroy, pianist Jaki Byard, bassist Jack Carter, and drummer Peter Littman.

Releases
The recording was released as a ten-inch album by Imperial Records. The original cover gave the title as Modern Saxaphone Stylings of Charlie Mariano. It was reissued in Japan by Phantom on August 20, 2002.

Track listing
"Chanticleer"
"Chopin Excerpts"
"April Afternoon"
"Chandra"
"Sasagapo"
"When Your Lover Has Gone"
"It's Magic"
"American Indian"

Personnel
Charlie Mariano – alto sax
Herb Pomeroy – trumpet
Jaki Byard – piano
Jack Carter – bass
Peter Littman – drums

References

 

1951 albums
Imperial Records albums
Charlie Mariano albums